"Cinderella" is the fourth and final single by Sweetbox from the album Classified, with Jade Villalon as a frontwoman. The song is based on Telemann's Concerto in D major for trumpet and piano.

One of its remixes can be found on the compilation album Best Of Sweetbox (2005) and on the remix album Best of 12" Collection (2006), another remix is on the album Sweet Reggae Mix (2008), a demo version can be found on Rare Tracks (2008).

The song was composed by Geoman, Villalon, Anne Braendeland and Jarl Aanestad.

Track listing

Charts

Sources

Songs based on fairy tales
Sweetbox songs
2001 singles
Songs written by Jade Villalon
2001 songs